
Gmina Paprotnia is a rural gmina (administrative district) in Siedlce County, Masovian Voivodeship, in east-central Poland. Its seat is the village of Paprotnia, which lies approximately 19 kilometres (12 mi) north-east of Siedlce and 99 km (61 mi) east of Warsaw.

Villages
Gmina Paprotnia contains the villages and settlements of Czarnoty, Grabowiec, Hołubla, Kaliski, Kobylany-Kozy, Koryciany, Krynki, Łęczycki, Łozy, Nasiłów, Paprotnia, Pliszki, Pluty, Podawce, Rzeszotków, Skwierczyn Lacki, Stare Trębice, Stasin, Strusy, Trębice Dolne, Trębice Górne and Uziębły.

Neighbouring gminas
Gmina Paprotnia is bordered by the gminas of Bielany, Korczew, Mordy, Przesmyki, Repki and Suchożebry.

References

Polish official population figures 2006

Paprotnia
Siedlce County